The Billboard Hot 100 is a chart that ranks the best-performing singles of the United States. Its data, published by Billboard magazine and compiled by Nielsen SoundScan, is based collectively on each single's weekly physical and digital sales, as well as airplay and streaming. Throughout a year, Billboard will publish an annual list of the 100 most successful songs throughout that year on the Hot 100 chart based on the information. For 2013, the list was published on December 13, calculated with data from December 1, 2012, to November 30, 2013.

"Thrift Shop" by Macklemore and Ryan Lewis featuring Wanz topped the Year-End Hot 100 chart, with a total of 7,208,000 copies sold in the US. Macklemore and Ryan Lewis's single "Can't Hold Us" featuring Ray Dalton also appeared in the list at number five, making the duo the fourth act to have two singles in the top five of the Year-End Hot 100 list. The second best-selling single of 2013 was "Blurred Lines" by Robin Thicke featuring T.I. and Pharrell, having sold 6,380,000 copies in the country. Meanwhile, "Radioactive" by Imagine Dragons and "Harlem Shake" by Baauer was listed on the list at number three and four, respectively.

List

See also
 2013 in American music
 List of Billboard Hot 100 number-one singles of 2013
 List of Billboard Hot 100 top-ten singles in 2013

References

United States Hot 100 Year-End
Billboard charts